WMSD (90.9 FM) is an FM radio station licensed to Rose Township, Michigan.  The station proper is located in the town of Lupton, Michigan.

In July 2000, a construction permit was issued and by August 11, 2000 the station began broadcasting at 90.9 FM.  The station prefers to refer to themselves as a Bible believing radio station rather than a Christian station. 

The station was originally an affiliate of the Fundamental Broadcasting Network, located in New Bern, North Carolina. In March 2005, the station began local programming via its own automation system, allowing the station to control its own programming schedule.

The station is a ministry of Bible Baptist Church of Lupton, Michigan.

References
Michiguide.com - WMSD History

External links

Ogemaw County, Michigan
Radio stations established in 2000
MSD